Zarina Hashmi (16 July 1937 – 25 April 2020), known professionally as Zarina, was an Indian-American artist and printmaker based in New York City. Her work spans drawing, printmaking, and sculpture. Associated with the Minimalist movement, her work utilized abstract and geometric forms in order to evoke a spiritual reaction from the viewer.

Biography
Born Zarina Rashid on 16 July 1937 in Aligarh, British India to Sheikh Abdur Rashid, faculty at Aligarh Muslim University, and Fahmida Begum, a homemaker, Zarina earned a degree in mathematics, BS (honours) from the Aligarh Muslim University in 1958. She then studied variety of printmaking methods in Thailand, and at Atelier 17 studio in Paris, apprenticing to Stanley William Hayter, and with printmaker Tōshi Yoshida in Tokyo, Japan. She lived and worked in New York City.

During the 1980s, Zarina served as a board member of the New York Feminist Art Institute and an instructor of papermaking workshops at the affiliated Women's Center for Learning. While on the editorial board of the feminist art journal Heresies, she contributed to the "Third World Women" issue.

Zarina died in London from complications of Alzheimer's disease on 25 April 2020.

Artistry 
Zarina's art was informed by her identity as a Muslim-born Indian woman, as well as a lifetime spent traveling from place to place. She used visual elements from Islamic religious decoration, especially the regular geometry commonly found in Islamic architecture. The abstract and spare geometric style of her early works has been compared to that of minimalists such as Sol LeWitt.

Zarina's work explored the concept of home as a fluid, abstract space that transcends physicality or location. Her work often featured symbols that call to mind such ideas as movement, diaspora, exile. For example, woodblock print Paper Like Skin depicts a thin black line meandering upward across a white background, dividing the page from the bottom right corner to the top left corner. The line possesses a cartographic quality that, in its winding and angular division of the page, suggests a border between two places, or perhaps a topographical chart of a journey that is yet unfinished.

Awards and fellowships 
 2007: Residency, University of Richmond, Richmond, Virginia
 2006: Residency, Montalvo Art Centre, Saratoga, California
 2002: Residency, William College, Williamstown, Massachusetts
 1994: Residency, Art-Omi, Omi, New York
 1991: Residency, Womens Studio Workshop, Rosendale, New York
 1990: Adolph and Esther Gottlieb Foundation Grant, New York foundation of the arts fellowship
 1989: International Biennial of Prints, Bhopal, India (Grand Prize)
 1985: New York Foundation for the arts Fellowship, New York
 1984: Printmaking Workshop Fellowship, New York
 1974: Japan Foundation Fellowship, Tokyo
 1969: President's Award for Printmaking, India

Solo exhibitions

Selected exhibitions 
Zarina was one of four artists/artist-groups to represent India in its first entry at the Venice Biennale in 2011.

The Hammer Museum in Los Angeles organized the first retrospective of her work in 2012. Entitled Zarina: Paper Like Skin, the exhibition traveled to the Solomon R. Guggenheim Museum and the Art Institute of Chicago.

During the 2017–18 academic year Zarina was the Artist-in-Residence at the Asian/Pacific/American Institute at NYU. The residency culminated in a solo exhibition, Zarina: Dark Roads (6 October 2017 – 2 February 2018) and a publication, Directions to My House.

Examples of her work are in the permanent collections of the Museum of Modern Art, the Whitney Museum of American Art, the National Gallery of Art, and the Bibliothèque Nationale de France.

References

External links
 Zarina's Website 
 images of Zarina's work at Luhring Augustine Gallery, New York
 Gallery Espace, New Delhi, India
 Jeanne Jaeger Bucher, Paris, France

1937 births
2020 deaths
20th-century American women artists
20th-century Indian women artists
21st-century Indian women artists
21st-century American women artists
Indian printers
Indian lithographers
People from Aligarh
Indian art critics
Indian women critics
American women artists of Indian descent
American women printmakers
Artists from New York City
Indian emigrants to the United States
21st-century Indian Muslims
American Muslims
Muslim artists
Women artists from Uttar Pradesh
Women lithographers